Unstable Unicorns is a dedicated deck card game designed and illustrated by Ramy Badie that was proposed on Kickstarter. The goal of the game is to control seven unicorn cards by playing unicorns and upgrade cards, and inhibiting other players with downgrades and other special cards. The game won the 2019 Toy Association's Toy of The Year Awards' People's Choice Award.

Expansions
 Christmas Expansion Pack
 Nightmares Expansion Pack
 Adventures Expansion Pack
 Unicorns of Legend Expansion Pack
 Dragons Expansion Pack
 Rainbow Apocalypse Expansion Pack
 NSFW Expansion Pack

References

External links 
 Unstable Unicorns at Unstable Games
 

Dedicated deck card games
Kickstarter-funded tabletop games